Lycia rachelae, the twilight moth, is a species of geometrid moth in the family Geometridae.

The MONA or Hodges number for Lycia rachelae is 6653.

References

Further reading

 

Bistonini
Articles created by Qbugbot
Moths described in 1896